Michael Terry Weiss (born February 2, 1962) is an American actor known for his role as Jarod in the television series The Pretender.

Early life
Michael Terry Weiss was born in Chicago, Illinois on February 2, 1962. His father was a steel industry executive and his mother was a homemaker. He has a sister, Jamie Sue Weiss, who became a make-up artist for television and films.  He went to Glenbrook North High School in Northbrook, Illinois.  He graduated from the University of Southern California.

Career
Weiss began acting when he was a child, where he appeared in local TV commercials in Chicago.

In 1980, at the age of 18, he appeared as an extra in the movie Ordinary People. Shortly after his college graduation, he was cast as Mike Horton on Days of Our Lives. Weiss also starred in the NBC-TV prime time drama The Pretender for four seasons as the lead character  Jarod. Weiss also had roles in the 1991 remake of "Dark Shadows (1991 TV series)," as well as in the movie Jeffrey, the animated series The Legend of Tarzan, and a recurring role on Crossing Jordan. He voiced "The Nameless One", the protagonist of computer game Planescape: Torment.

In February 2006, Weiss attended a benefit with his former Pretender co-stars Andrea Parker and James Denton for Cure Autism Now.

Weiss joined the cast of Impressionism, a play by Michael Jacobs and directed by Jack O'Brien. It opened at the Gerald Schoenfeld Theatre on March 12, 2009.

Weiss appeared in A Perfect Future, Off-Broadway at the Cherry Lane Theatre. The production was directed by Wilson Milam.

Filmography

Film

Television

Theatre

Video games

References

External links

Michael T. Weiss at the Internet Off-Broadway Database

1962 births
Living people
Male actors from Chicago
American male soap opera actors
American male stage actors
American male television actors
American male voice actors
University of Southern California alumni
Glenbrook North High School alumni
Disney people
Cartoon Network people